Casper Tengstedt (born 1 June 2000) is a Danish professional footballer who plays as a winger and forward for Primeira Liga club Benfica.

Early and personal life
His father is Thomas Tengstedt, who was also a footballer.

Club career
After playing for Viborg Søndermarken and Viborg FF, he signed for FC Midtjylland in 2015. Tengstedt signed a three-year contract extension in November 2017.

In September 2019 he signed on loan for German club 1. FC Nürnberg II. In August 2020 he moved on loan to AC Horsens. In June 2021, Tengstedt signed a permanent deal with the club. On 1 August 2022, Tengstedt signed for Norwegian club Rosenborg.

After scoring 15 goals and providing 7 assists in 14 league matches for Rosenborg, Tengstedt was sold to Portuguese club Benfica in January 2023, signing a contract until 2028.

International career
Tengstedt has represented Denmark at under-17, under-19 and under-21 youth levels.

References

External links
 Profile at the S.L. Benfica website

2000 births
Living people
Danish men's footballers
Denmark youth international footballers
Denmark under-21 international footballers
Viborg FF players
FC Midtjylland players
1. FC Nürnberg II players
AC Horsens players
Rosenborg BK players
S.L. Benfica footballers
S.L. Benfica B players
Regionalliga players
Danish Superliga players
Liga Portugal 2 players
Primeira Liga players
Association football wingers
Association football forwards
Danish expatriate men's footballers
Danish expatriate sportspeople in Germany
Expatriate footballers in Germany
Danish expatriate sportspeople in Norway
Expatriate footballers in Norway
Danish expatriate sportspeople in Portugal
Expatriate footballers in Portugal
Eliteserien players